Saint-Ferjeux is a district of Besançon located to the west of the city

Geography 
The sector is located to the west of the city, near Planoise, Tilleroyes and Grette

Monuments 
 Basilique Saint-Ferjeux 
 Cemetery

Education 
 Primary Public School Sapins

Transports 
 Lines 1, 3, 10, 20 and 27 serve the area

Areas of Besançon